The 1906–07 Kansas Jayhawks men's basketball team represented the University of Kansas in its ninth season of collegiate basketball. The head coach was James Naismith, the inventor of the game, who served in his 9th year. Naismith would retire after the season. The Jayhawks finished the season 7–8. Phog Allen, who would later become the Jayhawks head coach, played on the team. The season marked the beginning of the Jayhawks two biggest rivalries, the Border War with Missouri and the Sunflower Showdown against Kansas State.

Roster
Ralph Bergen
Phog Allen
John Hackett
George McCune
Milton Miller
William Miller
Charles Siler
Paul Wohler
Earl Woodward

Schedule

Popular culture
The Jayhawks March 11 game against Missouri, the first in the rivalry, was featured in the opening scene of the 2014 film Jayhawkers, as well as a conversation between James Naismith and Phog Allen about coaching after the game.

References

Kansas Jayhawks men's basketball seasons
Kansas
Kansas Jayhawks men's basketball
Kansas Jayhawks men's basketball